Caenoprosopon is a genus of horse flies in the family Tabanidae.

Species
Caenoprosopon australe (Ricardo, 1915)
Caenoprosopon dycei Mackerras, 1960
Caenoprosopon minus (Taylor, 1918)
Caenoprosopon nigrovittatum (Ferguson & Hill, 1920)
Caenoprosopon trichocerum (Bigot, 1892)

References

Tabanidae
Brachycera genera
Diptera of Australasia